The Downtown Hartford Historic District in Hartford, Kentucky is a  historic district which was listed on the National Register of Historic Places in 1988.

It is roughly the 100 and 200 blocks of Main St. and Courthouse Sq., and 100 blocks E. Union & E. Washington Streets.  The district includes the Ohio County Courthouse and its jail, and the Hartford city hall, among its 16 contributing buildings.

The Ohio County Courthouse "is the most imposing building" in the district.  It is a two-story concrete building designed by Walter Scott Roberts and built during 1940–1943.  It is the fourth courthouse on the location.

References

Historic districts on the National Register of Historic Places in Kentucky
Italianate architecture in Kentucky
Late 19th and Early 20th Century American Movements architecture
Buildings and structures completed in 1937
National Register of Historic Places in Ohio County, Kentucky
County courthouses in Kentucky
Hartford, Kentucky